Eiskogel ("ice peak") may refer to the following mountains:

 Eiskogel (Tennen Mountains), 2321 m, near Werfenweng in the Pongau, Salzburg state, Austria
 Eiskogel (Upper Austrian Prealps), 1,087 m, between Almtal und Kremstal, Upper Austria
 Großer Eiskogel, 3547 m, in the Ortler Alps, South Tyrol, Italy
 Kleiner Eiskogel, 3105 m, in the Ortler Alps, South Tyrol, Italy